A Little Bit Special is the first album recorded by comedian Stephen Lynch. It was recorded at Park West Studios in Brooklyn, New York in 2000.  Along with Superhero and The Craig Machine, the albums have sold over 250,000 copies.

In the song "Jim Henson's Dead", Lynch pays homage to many of the characters from The Muppet Show and Sesame Street, two of puppeteer Jim Henson's most famous creations. "R.D.C. (Opie's Lament)" is a song all about Rae Dawn Chong, who is Tommy Chong's daughter.

Track listing

- Includes: Bonus track – "Kitten"

Personnel
Stephen Lynch: Guitars, Vocals
Kevin Bagot: Guitars
Paul Loessel: Piano
Ivan Bodley: Bass, Keyboards, Percussion
Mike Denicola: Vocal Ad-Libs
Jay Mohr, Mark Teich: Additional Vocals

Stephen Lynch (musician) albums
2000 debut albums
2000s comedy albums